N-acetylgalactosamine-N, N'-diacetylbacillosaminyl-diphospho-undecaprenol 4-alpha-N-acetylgalactosaminyltransferase (PglJ) is an enzyme with systematic name UDP-N-acetyl-alpha-D-galactosamine:N-acetylgalactosaminyl-alpha-(1->3)-N,N'-diacetyl-alpha-D-bacillosaminyl-diphospho-tritrans,heptacis-undecaprenol 3-alpha-N-acetyl-D-galactosaminyltransferase. This enzyme catalyses the following chemical reaction

 UDP-N-acetyl-alpha-D-galactosamine + N-acetyl-D-galactosaminyl-alpha-(1->3)-N,N'-diacetyl-alpha-D-bacillosaminyl-diphospho-tritrans,heptacis-undecaprenol  UDP + N-acetyl-D-galactosaminyl-alpha-(1->4)-N-acetyl-D-galactosaminyl-alpha-(1->3)-N,N'-diacetyl-alpha-D-bacillosaminyl-diphospho-tritrans,heptacis-undecaprenol

This enzyme is isolated from Campylobacter jejuni.

References

External links 

EC 2.4.1